Tina Trstenjak (born 24 August 1990) is a Slovenian retired judoka who won gold in the Women's 63 kg at the 2016 Summer Olympics in Rio de Janeiro, Brazil. She also won the silver medal in Women's Judo 63 kg, at the 2020 Summer Olympics in Tokyo, Japan.

Medals

World championships
  Bronze medal at the 2018 World Championships in Baku.
  Silver medal at the 2017 World Championships in Budapest.
  Gold medal at the 2015 World Championships in Astana.
  Bronze medal at the 2014 World Championships in Chelyabinsk.
  Bronze medal at the 2009 Junior World Championships in Paris.
  Bronze medal at the 2008 Junior World Championships in Bangkok.

European championships
  Gold medal at the 2021 European Championships in Lisbon.
  Silver medal at the 2018 European Championships in Tel Aviv.
  Gold medal at the 2017 European Championships in Warsaw.
  Gold medal at the 2016 European Championships in Kazan.
  Silver medal at the 2015 European Championships in Baku.
  Silver medal at the 2014 European Championships in Montpellier.
  Team Bronze medal at the 2014 European Championships in Montpellier.
  Bronze medal at the 2013 European Championships in Budapest.

National Slovenian Championships
  Gold medal at the 2020 National Slovenian Championships.
  Silver medal at the 2019 National Slovenian Championships.
  Gold medal at the 2018 National Slovenian Championships.
  Gold medal at the 2017 National Slovenian Championships.
  Gold medal at the 2015 National Slovenian Championships.
  Gold medal at the 2014 National Slovenian Championships.
  Gold medal at the 2013 National Slovenian Championships.
  Silver medal at the 2012 National Slovenian Championships.
  Silver medal at the 2011 National Slovenian Championships.
  Gold medal at the 2010 National Slovenian Championships.
  Gold medal at the 2009 National Slovenian Championships.
  Silver medal at the 2007 National Slovenian Championships.
  Gold medal at the 2006 National Slovenian Championships.

Miscelleanous
  Gold medal at the 2020 Budapest Grand Slam.
  Silver medal at the 2020 Düsseldorf Grand Slam.
  Bronze medal at the 2020 Paris Grand Slam.
  Gold medal at the 2019 Abu Dhabi Grand Slam.
  Silver medal at the 2019 Paris Grand Slam.
  Bronze medal at the 2018 Abu Dhabi Grand Slam.
  Bronze medal at the 2018 Paris Grand Slam.
  Gold medal at the 2017 Paris Grand Slam.
  Gold medal at the 2015 Paris Grand Slam.
  Bronze medal at the 2017 Tokyo Grand Slam.
  Bronze medal at the 2016 Tokyo Grand Slam.
  Silver medal at the 2015 Tokyo Grand Slam.
  Gold medal at the 2014 Tokyo Grand Slam.

References

External links

 
 
 
 
 

1990 births
Living people
Slovenian female judoka
European Games silver medalists for Slovenia
European Games bronze medalists for Slovenia
European Games medalists in judo
Judoka at the 2015 European Games
Judoka at the 2016 Summer Olympics
Olympic judoka of Slovenia
Olympic medalists in judo
Medalists at the 2016 Summer Olympics
Olympic gold medalists for Slovenia
Sportspeople from Celje
Mediterranean Games bronze medalists for Slovenia
Mediterranean Games medalists in judo
Competitors at the 2009 Mediterranean Games
Judoka at the 2020 Summer Olympics
Olympic silver medalists for Slovenia
Medalists at the 2020 Summer Olympics
21st-century Slovenian women